Raccoon Bend is an unincorporated community in Austin County, in the U.S. state of Texas. According to the Handbook of Texas, the community had a population of 400 in 2000. It is located within the Greater Houston metropolitan area.

History
The area of Austin County west of the Brazos River was first settled in the early 1900s and the community of Raccoon Bend grew when the Humble Oil and Refining Company drilled oil and gas wells and opened the Raccoon Bend oilfield in 1927. The community had numerous houses, businesses relating to oil, and a church in the 1930s. A cemetery named Pleasant Grove Cemetery was also in the community. Its population was 400 in 2000.

Geography

Education
Raccoon Bend had its own school in the 1930s, which closed by the second half of the 20th century. Today, the community is served by the Bellville Independent School District.

References

Unincorporated communities in Austin County, Texas
Unincorporated communities in Texas